A Compilation, an album by Natalie MacMaster, was released in 1998 on the Rounder Records label. It consists of 16 tracks, compiled by Paul MacDonald, from MacMaster's first two albums, Four on the Floor and Road to the Isle. The album's total running time is 68:30.

Track listing 
Source: Allmusic

References 

Natalie MacMaster albums
1998 compilation albums